Amapala Airport  is an airstrip serving the town of Amapala on El Tigre Island, a volcanic island in the Gulf of Fonseca, Honduras.

See also

 Transport in Honduras
 List of airports in Honduras

References

External links
 FallingRain - Amapala Airport
OpenStreetMap - Amapala
 OurAirports - Amapala

Defunct airports
Airports in Honduras